Emil Nylund (23 November 1881 – 30 January 1926) was a Finnish rower. He competed in the men's coxed four event at the 1912 Summer Olympics.

References

1881 births
1926 deaths
Finnish male rowers
Olympic rowers of Finland
Rowers at the 1912 Summer Olympics
Sportspeople from Helsinki